Order of St. Thomas may refer to:
 Order of St. Thomas (award)
 Order of St. Thomas (religious order)
 Order of Saint Thomas of Acon